Dennis Grassow (born 10 October 1971 in Berlin) is a retired German footballer who played as a defender.

Career 

Grassow was born and raised in Berlin, before moving to Munich the age of 16. He joined TSV 1860 München, where he made one appearance in the Bayernliga, before moving on to SpVgg Starnberg and later FC Starnberg. He began his senior career in 1993 with SpVgg Unterhaching, where he had four successful years, which earned him a move to FC Bayern Munich.

He was unable to break into Bayern's first team, making only one appearance – in a DFB-Pokal game against DJK Waldberg, a match which Bayern won 16–1. After half a season he moved again, joining 1. FC Köln, where his arrival bolstered a struggling defence. He remained in Cologne for eighteen months, but the club was relegated at the end of the 1998–99 season, and he left, rejoining Unterhaching, who had since been promoted to the Bundesliga. The club spent two years in the Bundesliga, finishing 10th in their first season, but then suffered two consecutive relegations, falling to the third-tier Regionalliga in 2002. Grassow stayed with the club as they returned to the 2. Bundesliga, and consolidated their position, before leaving at the end of the 2003–04 season.

Grassow returned to the Regionalliga, playing for SV Darmstadt 98 for two years, before moving on to Bayernliga side SSV Jahn Regensburg in 2006. Here he was appointed captain by the coach Günter Güttler, as the side were promoted to the Regionalliga, which they followed with qualification for the new 3. Liga. After one season at this level, Grassow retired.

Honours
Bayern Munich
DFB-Liga-Pokal: 1997

References

External links
 
Dennis Grassow on ran.de

1971 births
Living people
German footballers
Association football defenders
TSV 1860 Munich II players
TSV 1860 Munich players
SpVgg Unterhaching players
FC Bayern Munich footballers
1. FC Köln players
SV Darmstadt 98 players
SSV Jahn Regensburg players
Bundesliga players
2. Bundesliga players
3. Liga players
Footballers from Berlin